This is a list of national government's administrations for railways, sometimes they exist as independent ministries and sometimes as part of transportation ministry. Some of them are also the national operators for railways while some of them are supervisors of railway operators. This does not include state-owned operators that are not part of the government.

Middle East Asia

East Asia
National Railway Administration (China)
Taiwan Railways Administration

South East Asia

South Asia
 Ministry of Railways (India) 
 Ministry of Railways (Pakistan)

Africa

North America
Federal Railroad Administration (United States)

South America

Europe
Norwegian National Rail Administration (Norway)
Swedish Rail Administration (Sweden)
Department for Transport (United Kingdom)

Oceania

National
Railways ministries